Brock Andrew Gillespie (born April 26, 1982) is an American professional basketball player, who last played for CB Ciudad de Valladolid, of the LEB, in Spain. He previously played in the NBA Development League and in various countries abroad. He was a high school All-American at Clarksville High School (Tennessee), and had a standout college career at Rice University, finishing his career with 1,007 points, while playing in the Western Athletic Conference. He also appeared in the Walt Disney movie Glory Road.

Professional career 
Gillespie went undrafted in the 2005 NBA draft. He later signed with the Auckland Stars for the 2006 New Zealand NBL season. In 17 games, he averaged 12.9 points, 1.7 rebounds and 1.4 assists in 24.9 minutes per game.

On November 2, 2006, he was selected in the third round of the 2006 NBA Development League Draft by the Austin Toros. In 41 games, he averaged 7.4 points, 1.7 rebounds and 1.7 assists in 20.2 minutes per game.

In July 2007, he joined the NBA's Charlotte Bobcats for the 2007 NBA Summer League. Later that year, he signed with Lleida Bàsquet of the LEB, in Spain. In December 2007, he was loaned to CB Plasencia. He left Plasencia after 7 games. In February 2008, he signed with BK SPU Nitra of the Eurocup and ExtraLiga, in Slovakia for the rest of the 2007–08 season.

On November 7, 2008, he was selected in the seventh round of the 2008 NBA Development League Draft by the Sioux Falls Skyforce. On November 26, 2008, he was waived by the Skyforce. In February 2009, he signed with Benetton Fribourg Olympic of the Eurocup and LNA, in Switzerland for the rest of the 2008–09 season.

In June 2009, he joined the NBA's Houston Rockets for training camp. In July 2009, he joined the NBA's Dallas Mavericks for the 2009 NBA Summer League. In September 2009, he signed with Xacobeo BluSens Obradoiro of Spain's Liga ACB, but did not play an official game for the team. On March 19, 2010, he was acquired by the Maine Red Claws of the NBA Development League.

In July 2010, he signed with the Cuxhaven Bascats of the ProA, in Germany for the 2010–11 season. In January 2011, he signed with SCM CSU Craiova of the Liga Națională, in Romania for the rest of the season.

In August 2011, he joined Lechugueros de Leon of the LNBP, in Mexico for the 2011–12 season. On November 3, 2011, he was selected in the eighth round of the 2011 NBA Development League Draft by the Sioux Falls Skyforce.

In January 2012, he signed with ŁKS Łódź of the TBL, in Poland. He later left when his contract was purchased by the Toyama Grouses of the Bj league, in Japan for the rest of the 2011–12 season.

On August 29, 2013, he signed with the Halifax Rainmen of the NBL, in Canada for the 2013–14 season. In March 2014, he signed a two-year contract with Bambuqueros de Neiva of the Liga DirecTV, in Colombia for the 2014 and 2015 seasons.

In May 2015, he was featured alongside fellow former NBA and D-League players, on an All-Star tour of Asia. 'Team Iverson' was coached by Allen Iverson and competed against CBA teams in China, finishing with an undefeated record.

In September 2015, he signed with CB Ciudad de Valladolid of the LEB, in Spain for the 2015–2016 season.

Personal 
In 2005, Gillespie received the Outstanding Achievement Award from the City of Houston's Mayor's Office. In 2006, he was cast by producer Jerry Bruckheimer and appeared in the Walt Disney movie, Glory Road. He was chosen to speak at Dennis Johnson's funeral in 2007, after playing for Johnson with the Austin Toros. In recent years, he has mentored for the National Basketball Players Association at their Top-100 High School Camp at the University of Virginia. 

He's also active in the political world; having served as Top Adviser to US Congressman Pete Olson, having spoken at the Conservative Political Action Conference, and regularly appears on Fox News.

References

External links 
Brock Gillespie Feature
Profile at Eurobasket.com
NBA D-League Profile
D-League stats
Finnish League profile

1982 births
Living people
American expatriate basketball people in Canada
American expatriate basketball people in China
American expatriate basketball people in Colombia
American expatriate basketball people in Finland
American expatriate basketball people in Germany
American expatriate basketball people in Japan
American expatriate basketball people in Mexico
American expatriate basketball people in New Zealand
American expatriate basketball people in Romania
American expatriate basketball people in Slovakia
American expatriate basketball people in Spain
American expatriate basketball people in Switzerland
Austin Toros players
Basketball players from Des Moines, Iowa
Basketball players from Tennessee
Fribourg Olympic players
Halifax Hurricanes players
Lechugueros de León players
Maine Red Claws players
Point guards
Rice Owls men's basketball players
Sioux Falls Skyforce players
Toyama Grouses players
American men's basketball players